Stanhopea grandiflora (Humb. & Bonpl.) Rchb.f. is a synonym of Stanhopea jenischiana.

Stanhopea grandiflora is a species of orchid occurring from Trinidad to southern tropical America.

References

External links 

grandiflora
Orchids of Trinidad
Taxa named by Alexander von Humboldt
Taxa named by Aimé Bonpland